Gayle, or Gail, is an English- and Afrikaans-based gay argot or slang used primarily by English and Afrikaans-speaking homosexual men in urban communities of South Africa, and is similar in some respects to Polari in the United Kingdom, from which some lexical items have been borrowed. The equivalent language used by gay South African men who speak Bantu languages is called IsiNgqumo, and is based on a Nguni lexicon.

Gayle originally manifested as moffietaal (Afrikaans: literally, "homosexual language") in the drag culture of the Cape Coloured community in the 1950s.  It permeated into white homosexual circles in the 1960s and became part of mainstream white gay culture.

Besides a few core words borrowed from Polari (such as the word varda meaning "to see", itself a borrowing from Lingua Franca), most of Gayle's words are alliterative formations using women's names, such as Beulah for "beauty", Priscilla, meaning "police", and Hilda for "hideous". Men, especially other homosexual men, are often referred to by female pronouns in some circles, as is the custom among many homosexual countercultures throughout the world.

Gayle arose for the same reason that most antilanguages develop, to ensure in-group preference in diverse societies.  However it also fulfilled other functions such as to "camp up" conversation, and provide entertainment in a subculture where verbal wit and repartee are highly valued.

Commonly used terms

Varda that Beulah bag! translates to "Look at that beautiful man!"

See also
Lavender linguistics

References

LGBT culture in South Africa
LGBT slang
English-based argots
LGBT linguistics
Cant languages